Cheung Wai On (born May 2, 1981) is a Chinese Grand Prix motorcycle racer.

Career statistics

By season

Races by year

(key)

External links
http://www.motogp.com/en/riders/Wai+On+Cheung

1981 births
Living people
Place of birth missing (living people)
Chinese motorcycle racers
125cc World Championship riders